Scenic Views is the debut studio album by Rhode Island new wave band Rubber Rodeo. It was released on November 15, 1984 by Mercury Records.

Background 
After releasing several singles and EPs on Eat Records, Rubber Rodeo released their debut studio album in November 1984. Working with British new wave producer Hugh Jones, the album featured a range of musical instruments including mandolin, violin, synthesizer, organ, dobro, and pedal steel guitar.

The popularity of Scenic Views partially benefited from the marketing efforts of Polygram. In a 1984 interview published in Billboard, PolyGram Music Video vice president Len Epand stated that the company was "shifting its gears" and beginning to "emphasize marketing over production." Later in the interview, Epand cited Scenic Views as an example of an album that "reaped huge benefits from a seemingly small-scale video release... which produced a Grammy nomination for an almost unknown group". The Grammy that Rubber Rodeo received a nomination for was the long-form video they made for Scenic Views. The video was directed by David Greenberg and produced by Second Story Television.

Reception 
In Rolling Stone, Kurt Loder wrote that "Scenic Views isn't a bad record, but given Rubber Rodeo's multifaceted resources, the next album ought to be a lot better." J. D. Considine wrote that "Rubber Rodeo may play mutant, post-wave C&W-pop, but it's still rooted in the country's plainspoken bedrock of yearning and heartache." Considine coined the term cowboy pop in the same review, which was published in Musician Magazine.

Track listing 

 "Need You, Need Me" (4:39)
 "Slow Me Down" (3:31)
 "Anywhere With You" (4:40)
 "Walking After Midnight" (3:56)
 "City of God" (5:13)
 "The Hardest Thing" (3:15)
 "House of Pain" (4:45)
 "Mess o' Me" (5:03)
 "Before I Go Away (5:57)
 "Woman of Straw" (4:20)*

Personnel 
Per the liner notes.

 John Doelp – bass
 Barc Holmes – drums
 Bob Holmes – guitar, mandolin, violin, vocals
 Gary Leib – synthesizer, 
 Trish Milliken – organ, piano, vocals
 Mark Tomeo – dobro, pedal steel guitar

References

External links 
 Scenic Views album review

1984 albums
Albums produced by Hugh Jones (producer)
Rubber Rodeo albums
Mercury Records albums